Vanessa Kwan is an art curator and artist based in Vancouver, British Columbia, Canada who believes in collaborative, site-specific and cross-disciplinary practices.

Background 
Kwan was born in St. John’s, Newfoundland. She graduated from Emily Carr University in 2004.

Curatorial 
Kwan's curatorial work includes positions held at the Richmond Art Gallery, British Columbia, the Vancouver Art Gallery and grunt gallery, Vancouver where she was Curator (2014-2019) and then in 2019, Program director. According to Kwan, her role as a curator often "consists of producing artist projects that engage with the community, are site-specific, and are generally not situated inside the gallery." Kwan elaborates that she interested in "art practices that are not focused solely on the gallery, but might be produced elsewhere."

Kwan is a member of Other Sights for Artist's Projects, a public art collective in Vancouver. Kwan is also a founding member of Norma public art collective that began while she was studying at Emily Carr University. 

In addition to these artistic and curatorial activities, Kwan works closely with Vancouver-based artists, Hannah Jickling and Helen Reed on Big Rock Candy Mountain, a project initiated in early 2015.

In 2022, she was chosen as Director + Curator, Gallery + Exhibitions at Emily Carr University (ECU) in charge of the Libby Leshgold Gallery and other university exhibition spaces and venues, as well as READ Books, ECU Press, the ECU Art Collection and the university’s outdoor screen.

Artistic Practice 
Kwan created Vancouver Vancouver Vancouver, a public art work for the 2010 Winter Olympics.

In 2013, Kwan created an interactive piece entitled Everything Between Open and Closed, a work that was temporarily sited at the Bob Prittie Burnaby Public Library as a part of its KIOSK event. For that project, the artist occupied the kiosk for two weeks creating signs that were posted on the walls of the kiosk, as a means of interacting with the community space.

Residencies 
In 2017, Kwan completed a post residency in Visual + Digital Arts at the Banff Centre for Arts and Creativity, Banff, Calgary, and received the Post Residency Award from the Banff Centre for Residency.

References 

Living people
Canadian art curators
Artists from Vancouver
Year of birth missing (living people)
Canadian women curators